The beach kingfisher (Todiramphus saurophagus) is a species of bird in the family Alcedinidae. It is found in Indonesia, Papua New Guinea, and Solomon Islands. Its natural habitat is subtropical or tropical mangrove forests.

References

beach kingfisher
beach kingfisher
Birds of the Maluku Islands
Birds of New Guinea
Birds of the Solomon Islands
beach kingfisher
Taxonomy articles created by Polbot